The 2006–07 season was Deportivo de La Coruña's 36th season in La Liga, the top division of Spanish football. They also competed in the Copa del Rey. The season covered the period 1 July 2006 to 30 June 2007.

Season summary

Coach Joaquín Caparrós's second season in charge saw Deportivo slip into the bottom half of the table, placing 13th. This was their worst finish in La Liga since 1991–92, and ultimately cost Caparrós his job. Despite fairing somewhat better in the Copa del Rey, reaching the semi-finals for the second consecutive year before losing to eventual winners Sevilla, Caparrós was replaced by Real Sociedad coach Miguel Ángel Lotina ahead of the following season.

Kit

Deportivo's kit was manufactured by Joma and sponsored by Fadesa.

Players

Squad
Retrieved on 30 March 2021

Left club during season

Out on loan for the full season

Squad stats 
Last updated on 30 March 2021.

|-
|colspan="14"|Players who have left the club after the start of the season:

|}

La Liga

See also
2006–07 La Liga
2006–07 Copa del Rey

References

External links 
  
Unofficial Spanish fansite 
Another unofficial Spanish fansite 
Official international website 
Official international forum 
Polish site 
Unofficial arabic fansite
Unofficial Turkey Fan 
Unofficial Russian Fan

Deportivo de La Coruna
Deportivo de La Coruña seasons